Hermann Rhodén (born 22 April 1993) is a Norwegian former professional footballer who plays as a goalkeeper for Grorud IL in the 2. divisjon.

Playing career

Club
Rhodén was born in Drammen, and grew up in Krokstadelva. He spent his youth years in local club Birkebeineren, before signing with Strømsgodset's youth team.

Rhodén got his first team Tippeliga debut for Strømsgodset in the away match against Start on 3 April 2011. Without a professional contract at the time, Rhodén was included in the squad due to injuries, and when Adam Larsen Kwarasey was sent off in the 9th minute, he had to step up. Although his team lost 1–5, the goalkeeper was praised for his debut.

He spent the 2012 season on loan to Third Division side Vestfossen IF.

He signed a professional contract with Strømsgodset on 4 April 2013, lasting until the end of the 2014 season.

Rhodén was the backup goalkeeper for the first half of the title-winning 2013 season, but did not feature in any matches. He played for the reserve team in the Norwegian 2nd Division, before being sent on loan to local 3rd Division team Stoppen SK for the second half of the season.

In 2014, he signed for 2. divisjon club Drammen FK on a season-long loan. The loan deal was made permanent after the 2014 season.

Rhodén is also known in Norway from the NRK reality show "Nummer 1 - Norges største keepertalent", where former Norwegian internationals Frode Grodås and Stig Inge Bjørnebye searched for the best goalkeeper talent in Norway between the ages 15 and 17. In the show, which was aired in 2011, Rhodén came third.

Career statistics

Honours

Club 

 Strømsgodset
 Tippeligaen (1): 2013

References 

1993 births
Living people
People from Nedre Eiker
Sportspeople from Drammen
Norwegian footballers
Strømsgodset Toppfotball players
Eliteserien players
Association football goalkeepers